The Federação Goiana de Futebol (English: Football Association of Goiás state) was founded on November 1, 1939, and manages all the official football tournaments within the state of Goiás, which are the Campeonato Goiano, the Campeonato Goiano lower levels, and represents the clubs at the Brazilian Football Confederation (CBF).

Current clubs in Brasileirão 
As of 2022 season. Common team names are noted in bold.

References

Goiana
Football in Goiás
Sports organizations established in 1931